The Symphony No. 6 by the American composer William Schuman  was commissioned by the Dallas Symphony League and was given its world premiere by the Dallas Symphony Orchestra under the conductor Antal Doráti on February 27, 1949.

Composition
The symphony has a duration of roughly 27 minutes and is composed in one continuous movement.

Instrumentation
The work is scored for a large orchestra comprising three flutes, two oboes, English horn, two clarinets, bass clarinet, two bassoons, contrabassoon, four horns, three trumpets, three trombones, tuba, timpani, two percussionists, and strings.

Reception
Though the world premiere was poorly received by its Dallas audience, the piece has since been praised by music critics.  Andrew Clements of The Guardian praised the symphony, remarking:
The work was similarly praised by Lawrence A. Johnson of the Chicago Classical Review who wrote:

References

Symphonies by William Schuman
1948 compositions
Schuman 06
Music commissioned by the Dallas Symphony Orchestra